Rhysothorax is a genus of dung beetles in the family Scarabaeidae, containing only one species, R. rufus. It has at times been classified as a subgenus within Aegialia.

References

Further reading

External links

Scarabaeidae
Monotypic Scarabaeidae genera
Articles created by Qbugbot